Sigurd Christensen (16 April 1911 – 23 November 1963) was a Danish sailor. He competed in the O-Jolle event at the 1936 Summer Olympics.

References

External links
 

1911 births
1963 deaths
Danish male sailors (sport)
Olympic sailors of Denmark
Sailors at the 1936 Summer Olympics – O-Jolle
Sportspeople from Copenhagen